Bucculatrix galinsogae is a moth in the family Bucculatricidae. It is found in Ecuador. The species was described in 2013 by G. Deschka.

References

Natural History Museum Lepidoptera generic names catalog

Bucculatricidae
Moths described in 2013
Moths of South America